Vaset may refer to:
 Vaset, Kerman, Iran
 Vaset, Razavi Khorasan, Iran
 Vaset, Norway